Henry Nott (1774–1844) was a British Protestant Christian missionary who lived and worked in Tahiti, in the Society Islands in Polynesia.

Life
Nott was one of the first missionaries sent out by the London Missionary Society, arriving in Tahiti aboard the mission ship “Duff” in 1797. He had been a bricklayer by trade and the mission did not prepare these missionaries well for their situation in Tahiti. The "Duff" took a year to return to England. Then, when it was loaded with supplies and returning to Tahiti, it was taken by a French ship, Britain and France being at war during the reign of Napoleon.

During the five-year wait for resupply, several of his fellow missionaries deserted, died, or seemed to go mad. Nott continued on, building a relationship with the new king, Pomare II. Nott did not see his first convert until he had been in Tahiti 22 years, Pomare II. Nott learned the language and worked with Pomare II on translating the Bible into the Tahitian language. Missionary historian Ruth A. Tucker describes Nott as the primary translator of the Bible into Tahitian, writing: 

He married a newly arrived missionary from Britain, but she was not content in Tahiti and died within two years.

Nott returned to England only twice during his 47 years overseas. He died on 2 May 1844.

References

Popular Biography 
Joyce Reason. The Bricklayer and the King: Henry Nott of the South Seas. London, Edinburgh House, 1938.

Notes

External links
Wholesome Words biography

English Anglican missionaries
English evangelicals
Protestant missionaries in French Polynesia
Translators of the Bible into Polynesian languages
1774 births
1844 deaths
British expatriates in French Polynesia
British evangelicals
Evangelical Anglicans
Missionary linguists